The Church of Nerkin Ankuzik was a ruinous Armenian church located in the abandoned Nerkin Ankuzik or Ashaghykand village (Julfa District) of the Nakhchivan Autonomous Republic of Azerbaijan. The church was located in the northern part of the abandoned village.

History 
The church was founded in the 11–12th centuries and renovated several times. The last time it was renovated in the 17th century.

Architecture 
The church was a basilica structure with a polygonal apse, two vestries, and a hall.

Destruction 
The apse and foundation of the church were still intact as of October 7, 2001. However, by November 11, 2009, the church had been razed, its building stones removed, and the site bulldozed, as documented by investigation of the Caucasus Heritage Watch.

References 

Armenian churches in Azerbaijan
Ruins in Azerbaijan